Sardinha cabinet was the Council of Ministers in the Goa Legislative Assembly headed by Chief Minister Francisco Sardinha.

Council members 
 Dayanand Narvekar - Deputy Chief Minister, Minister of Education, Science and Technology and Printing and Stationery
 Subhash Shirodkar - Minister of Public Works Department, Mining and Information
 Mauvin Godinho - Minister of Revenue, Inspectorate of Factories & Boilers, Weights and Measures
 Francise D'Souza - Minister of Law & Judiciary and Labour & Employment, Urban Development
 Francise Silveira - Minister of Food Civil Supplies, Sports & Youth Affairs and Housing Board
 Aleixo Sequeira - Minister of Industries, Information and Technology, Official Language and Public Grievances.
 Somnath Zuarkar - Minister of Transport, Cooperation and Inland Water Transport
 Arecio D'Souza - Minister of Agriculture, Provedoria and Fisheries
 Venkatesh Desai - Minister of Panchayati Raj, Rural Development Agency and Non-Conventional source of Energy
 Victoria Fernandes - Minister of Tourism, Animal Husbandry, Women & Child Development, Fisheries and Agriculture

Former members 

 Digambar Kamat - Minister of Power, Protocol, Art & Culture
 Prakash Phadte - Minister of Education, Science and Technology and Printing and Stationery
 Suresh Amonkar - Minister of Health, Social Welfare and Labour & Employment

References 

Cabinets established in 1999
1999 establishments in Goa
Goa ministries
2000 disestablishments in India
Cabinets disestablished in 2000